Perfect to Me may refer to:

 "Perfect to Me", 2005 song by Al Green from his album Everything's OK
 "Perfect to Me", 2014 song by Marc Broussard from his album A Life Worth Living
 "Perfect to Me", 2018 song by Dave Audé

See also
 "Perfect" (Anne-Marie song), a 2018 song by Anne-Marie, retitled "Perfect to Me" for its remix